The Unknown War (Russian: "Великая Отечественная" (The Great Patriotic War) or "Неизвестная война" (The Unknown War) is an American documentary television series. The 20-part series documents the World War II conflict between Nazi Germany and the Soviet Union. The show was produced and syndicated for international distribution by Air Time International, and the executive producer was Fred Weiner. Each episode is about 48 minutes long, similar in format to The World at War documentary series. The footage was edited from over 3.5 million feet of film taken by Soviet camera crews from the first day of the war during Operation Barbarossa on 22 June 1941 through the Soviet invasion of Manchuria in August 1945. Most of these films have never been seen outside this documentary series.

The series is hosted by Academy Award winner Burt Lancaster, who spent three weeks in eight cities in the USSR for location filming. Film footage from Soviet archives comprises a major portion of the series, supplemented by film from both the United States and British archives. Appearing in exclusive interviews would be Russian Commanders like Georgi Zhukov and Vasily Chuikov. Other interviews shot for the series included Soviet general secretary Leonid Brezhnev and Averell Harriman, who was U.S. Ambassador to the Soviet Union during World War II.

The series was produced with Soviet cooperation after the release of The World at War. Fred Weiner believed that a TV series featuring never before seen footage of the battles on the Eastern front would be of great interest to viewers and worldwide TV stations. Released in 1978, The Unknown War promoted the scope of the Soviet participation against Nazi Germany. The program was purchased first by German TV and quickly thereafter by TV stations in New York and Boston. Eventually the program was purchased by approximately 75 American TV stations and over 50 foreign broadcasters. After the Soviet Union's invasion of Afghanistan in 1979, several American TV stations, responding to public outcry, temporarily halted airings. Later it returned to additional airings on cable, including A&E, the History Channel, and Hulu. The series was released on a 5-disc DVD set in 2011.

Episodes

 June 22, 1941
 The Battle for Moscow
 The Siege of Leningrad
 To the East
 The Defense of Stalingrad
 Survival at Stalingrad
 The World's Greatest Tank Battle
 War in the Arctic
 War in the Air
 The Partisans
 The Battle of the Seas
 The Battle of Caucasus
 The Liberation of Ukraine
 The Liberation of Belorussia
 The Balkans to Vienna
 The Liberation of Poland
 The Allies
 The Battle of Berlin
 The Last Battle of the Unknown War
 A Soldier of the Unknown War

Soundtrack
The series has a recurrent theme song " Toward the Unknown " written by Rod McKuen and "Birch-tree's dreams" ("Берёзовые сны") by G. Fere (Г. Фере) and V. Geviksman (В. Гевиксман).

See also
 Alexandrov Ensemble soloists (song by Geviksman and Fere)

References

External links
 The Unknown War (20 episodes) // Russian Newsreels and Documentary Films Archive
 

Documentary television series about World War II
Eastern Front (World War II)
1978 television films